Juho Pietola (born 6 April 2002) is a Finnish professional footballer, who plays as a defender for Finnish premier division club Ilves.

References 

2002 births
Living people
Finnish footballers
Association football defenders
FC Ilves players